J. Williams may refer to:

J. Williams (cinematographer) (1948–2005), producer, director and cinematographer of Malayalam-language films
J. Williams (singer) (born 1986), New Zealand singer and dancer
J. J. Williams Jr. (1905–1968), American lawyer, banker, and politician
J. T. Williams (fl. 1928–1930), football coach at Kentucky State University, United States

See also